KDRM (99.3 FM) is a radio station licensed to Moses Lake, Washington, United States.  The station is owned by Ksem, Inc. The transmitter for KDRM is located on Marsh Island, next to the transmitter for KBSN, its sister station on AM 1470.

KDRM broadcasts live at local events including the Spring Festival (aka Springfest) and Grant County Fair. Moses Lake High School sports and Seattle Seahawks are broadcast on KBSN.

History
The station had been known as KDRM. On November 1, 1989, the station changed its call sign to KBSN-FM but the next day changed back to the KDRM call letters.

References

External links

DRM
Adult hits radio stations in the United States
Radio stations established in 1989
Mass media in Grant County, Washington